The 1973 Maghreb Athletics Championships was the sixth edition of the international athletics competition between the countries of the Maghreb. Algeria, Tunisia and Morocco were the competing nations. Organised by the Union des Fédérations d'Athlétisme du Maghreb Uni (Union of Athletics Federations of the United Maghreb), it took place from 27–29 July in Agadir, Morocco. It was the third Moroccan city to host the event, after Rabat in 1967 and Casablanca in 1971. A total of 36 athletics events were contested, 22 for men and 14 for women.

The event winners were distributed fairly evenly between the teams, with Morocco and Tunisia each taking thirteen gold medals and Algeria having the remaining ten. Tunisia topped the table by merit of having more silver medals. Track events were only officially timed to the tenth of a second.

Medal summary

Men

Women

References

Champions
Les championnats maghrebins d athletisme. Union Sportive Oudja. Retrieved on 2015-02-20.

Maghreb Athletics Championships
Sport in Agadir
Maghreb Athletics Championships
Maghreb Athletics Championships
International athletics competitions hosted by Morocco